Jennifer L. Johnson is an American diplomat and U.S. State Department official who is the nominee to serve as the United States ambassador to the Federated States of Micronesia.

Early life, education and personal life 

A native of New York, Johnson earned a Bachelor of Arts from Villanova University and studied abroad at the University of New South Wales in Australia. She earned a Master of Science from the National War College. Johnson speaks Spanish, Turkish, and Japanese.

Career 

Johnson is a career member of the Senior Foreign Service with the rank of minister-counselor. Early in her career, she was selected to participate in the Una Chapman Cox Sabbatical Leave Fellowship. Previously, Johnson served overseas in leadership positions at U.S. embassies and consulates in Cuba, Chile, United Arab Emirates, and Turkey. She has held domestic positions at the United States Mission to the United Nations in New York, the Office of the Under Secretary for Management, the Executive Secretariat, the Bureau of Western Hemisphere Affairs, and the Bureau of Global Talent Management. She previously served as  acting deputy assistant secretary and director of the Office of Policy Coordination in the Bureau of Global Talent Management. Since July 15, 2021, she has served as chief of staff to the Under Secretary of State for Management.

Nomination as ambassador to Micronesia 
On January 23, 2023, President Joe Biden nominated Johnson to serve as the  United States ambassador to the Federated States of Micronesia. Her nomination is pending before the Senate Foreign Relations Committee.

References

Living people
Year of birth missing (living people)
Place of birth missing (living people)
21st-century American diplomats
American women ambassadors
American women diplomats
National War College alumni
United States Department of State officials
United States Foreign Service personnel
Villanova University alumni